Plus500 is a global fintech firm providing online trading services in contracts for difference (CFDs), share dealing, futures trading and options on futures. The company has subsidiaries in the UK, Cyprus, Australia, Israel, Seychelles, Singapore, Bulgaria, Estonia, the United States and Japan. It is listed on the London Stock Exchange and is a constituent of the FTSE 250 Index.

History
The company was founded in 2008 by six alumni of the Technion - Israel Institute of Technology with an initial investment of only $400,000.

The initial platform was based on a Windows OS. In 2010, Plus500 launched a web based version of its online trading platform, allowing Mac and Linux users to trade online. In 2011, it launched its first app for iPad and iPhone users.

In 2012, Plus500 introduced its Android-based trading platform for Android smartphones and tablets.

In October 2012, Plus500UK Ltd was fined £205,128 by the FCA failing to report transactions accurately for a year and a half. The company was not able to submit complete and accurate transaction reports because of the absence of appropriate systems and controls, documented procedures, or appropriate training for staff.  (Chapter 17 of the FSA’s Supervision manual and Principle 3 of the FCA’s Principles for Businesses).

In 2013, the company went public on the Alternative Investment Market section of the London Stock Exchange.

In 2014, the company launched its Windows app.

In May 2015, Plus500 was hit with massive value loss when its stock plunged almost 60 percent due to the company's move to freeze UK based trader accounts. The UK Financial Conduct Authority had ordered Plus500UK (the UK subsidiary of Plus500) to freeze the accounts as part of a review into anti-money-laundering controls. Most customers were able to access their funds within 2 months. The Australian and the Cyprus subsidiaries were not affected.

In June 2015, Plus500 agreed to a US$703 million bid from Playtech, an online gambling company that was expanding into trading. However, Playtech walked away from the deal in November 2015 after it failed to get regulatory approval for the takeover.

In 2016, the Israeli operating subsidiary of the company, Plus500IL Ltd. was one of a small number of companies to be granted a Trading Arena Licence by the Israeli Security Authority (ISA). In that same year, Plus500 released an app for Apple Watch to trade and view account details directly from Apple’s wearable.

In early December 2017, Plus500SG Pte Ltd., the Singapore subsidiary of Plus500, was granted a Capital Markets Services license by the Monetary Authority of Singapore (MAS) for dealing in securities and leveraged foreign exchange trading.

In June 2018, Plus500 launched its Economic Calendar, covering major financial events and indicators from all over the world, which are provided by Dow Jones & Company, a subsidiary of News Corp. Plus500’s calendar includes a list of the most highly-affected instruments for each economic event.

In July 2018, shares of Plus500 were listed in the main market of the London Stock Exchange and the company joined the UK FTSE 250 index of leading mid-cap listed companies.

In 2021, Plus500 named Professor Jacob Frenkel, former Chairman of JP MorganChase International and former governor of the bank of Israel as its new Chairman. 

In April 2021, Plus500 signed a deal to acquire Cunningham Commodities LLC. and Cunningham Trading Systems LLC. and in July 2021, Plus500 announced completion of Cunningham’s acquisition, a technology trading platform provider that operates in the futures market in the U.S. as part of the company’s global expansion program. 

In June 2021, Plus500’s new research and development (“R&D”) center was opened in Tel Aviv, Israel.

In July 2021, Plus500 released its ‘Plus500 Invest’ stock-trading platform, which includes over 2,000 financial trading instruments. 

In October 2021, a class action was filed against the Israeli subsidiary of Plus500 claiming that the company paused the trading of certain options for 90 minutes, with the aim of preventing Plus500 from incurring losses, violating the Securities Law.

In March 2022, Plus500 acquired the Japanese company, EZ Invest Securities - which specialises in the trading of securities and derivatives.

In June 2022, Plus500 launched an advertising campaign featuring the Emmy and Golden Globe winning actor Kiefer Sutherland in the United Kingdom, Italy, the Netherlands, Germany, and Australia.

In September 2022, Plus500 continued to expand its global footprint by launching TradeSniper, a pioneering Futures trading app tailored for retail U.S. customers.

Technology
Since the company’s inception, Plus500 has utilized proprietary, internally developed technologies. These technologies include the company’s trading platform (available on multiple operating systems, including iOS, Android, Windows, and Surface), risk management tools, customer onboarding, affiliates, back-office systems, marketing, and cashier systems.

Operations

Plus500 trading apps are supported in 32 languages, including English, German, Italian, Spanish, French, Arabic, Chinese and more. It has been reported that 40% of the transactions were made by either Smartphones or tablets.

In December 2017, European and UK watchdogs announced details of planned restrictions on the spreadbetting and CFD sectors. Plus500 CEO Asaf Elimelech said "the board believes the proposals are unlikely to have a material adverse effect on the group's business, thanks to its highly flexible business model".

In February 2019, The Times reported that in the company's 2017 Annual Report Plus500 had told investors "in 2017, as in 2016 and 2015, the company did not generate net revenues or losses from market P&L", however in February 2019 the company issued a contradictory report stating that it had incurred a $103 million loss from client trading activity in the 2017 financial year.

As of the third quarter of 2021, they had 166,310 active clients (that are actively trading on their platform). This number fluctuates each quarter, and is actually down from the 197,976 active clients in the same period last year.

Trading licences

Plus500UK Ltd., authorised and regulated by the Financial Conduct Authority (FCA), FRN 509909;

Plus500CY Ltd., authorised and regulated by the Cyprus Securities and Exchange Commission (CySEC) SEC registration number 250/14;

Plus500AU Pty Ltd. AFSL #417727, issued by the ASIC). In addition, Plus500AU Pty Ltd is authorised to provide its services by the FMA in New Zealand (FSP No. 486026) and the FSCA in South Africa (#47546).

Plus500IL Ltd, authorised and regulated by the Israel Securities Authority (ISA).

Plus500SEY Ltd., authorised and regulated by the Seychelles Financial Services Authority (FSA)  with Licence No. SD039.

Plus500SG Pte Ltd., regulated by the Monetary Authority of Singapore (MAS), License No. CMS100648-1.

Funds protection 
According to saferinvestor, as of July 2021, only UK and CySec regulators offer any form of funds protection in case of broker insolvency. If you are regulated in the UK by The FCA you will fall under the purview of The Financial Services Compensation Scheme (FSCS) and have 100% deposit protection up to £85,000. CySec regulated brokers offer a guarantee of funds of 90% of remaining deposit up to €20,000 in case of liquidation of the firm.

Sponsorships
To complement its online marketing technology efforts, in January 2015, Plus500 signed a sponsorship deal with Atlético de Madrid Football Club. Later that year, Plus500 became the club's main sponsor and kept that title for the next 7 years until June 2022. In December 2016, Plus500 became the major sponsor of the Brumbies, an Australian professional rugby union football team. Later, in 2020, Plus500 signed sponsorship agreements with three major football clubs: Swiss Super League champions Young Boys, Poland's champions Legia Warsaw, and Serie A club Atalanta. In 2022, Plus500 signed a multi-year sponsorship agreement with the iconic NBA team, the Chicago Bulls, aiming to drive brand awareness in the U.S.

References

External links
Official site

Financial services companies based in the City of London
Trading companies
Online brokerages
Electronic trading platforms
Financial services companies established in 2008
Companies listed on the London Stock Exchange
Financial derivative trading companies
Foreign exchange companies
Israeli brands